Jean-Pierre Caffet (born 8 November 1951) is a member of the Senate of France, representing the city of Paris between 2004 and 2017.  He was a member of the Socialist Party, and moved to LREM in 2017.

References
Page on the Senate website (in French)

1951 births
Living people
Socialist Party (France) politicians
French Senators of the Fifth Republic
La République En Marche! politicians
Senators of Paris
People from Algiers